László Aradszky (20 September 1935 – 8 October 2017) was a Hungarian pop singer, who became successful in the 1960s after participation in the talent show Táncdalfesztivál.

References

External links
 

1935 births
2017 deaths
20th-century Hungarian male singers
Musicians from Budapest